Act III is the third album by the progressive bluegrass Maryland band The Seldom Scene. The album features the band in their "classic" lineup. 
.

Track listing
 "Chim-Chim-Cher-Ee" (Richard M. Sherman, Robert B. Sherman) – 1:20
 "Little Georgia Rose" (Bill Monroe) – 2:57
 "Another Lonesome Day" (Wendy Thatcher) – 2:04
 "Willie Boy" (Phil Rosenthal) – 2:57
 "Faded Love" (Bob Wills, John Wills) – 2:04
 "Rider" (Traditional; arranged by the Seldom Scene) – 5:23
 "Muddy Water" (Phil Rosenthal) – 3:00
 "Mean Mother Blues" (John Starling) – 3:00
 "Sing Me Back Home" (Merle Haggard) – 2:56
 "Hail to the Redskins" (Barnee Breeskin, Corinne Griffith) – 1:53
 "Don't Bother with White Satin" (John Duffey, Ann Hill) – 2:55
 "Heaven" (Boyd McSpadden, Helen McSpadden) – 2:56

Personnel
The Seldom Scene
 John Starling – vocals, guitar
 John Duffey – mandolin, vocals
 Ben Eldridge – banjo, guitar, vocals
 Mike Auldridge – Dobro, guitar, vocals
 Tom Gray – bass, vocals

with:
 Ricky Skaggs – violin
 Clayton Hambrick – guitar

References

External links
Official site

1973 albums
The Seldom Scene albums
Rebel Records albums